El Horria⁩ (Judeo-Moroccan Arabic: אלחוררייא⁩⁩) or  was a Judeo-Moroccan newspaper published by Salomon Benaioun in two versions: one in Judeo-Moroccan Arabic and one in French.

It was scanned and digitized in the Historical Jewish Press project.

References 

Bilingual newspapers
Judeo-Arabic-language newspapers
French-language newspapers published in Morocco